The Billboard Top Latin albums chart, published in Billboard magazine, is a record chart that features Latin music sales information. These data are compiled by Nielsen SoundScan from a sample that includes music stores, music departments at electronics and department stores, Internet sales (both physical and digital) and verifiable sales from concert venues in the United States.

There were twenty number-one albums in 2003, including Hijas del Tomate, the debut album by Spanish trio Las Ketchup; and Mambo Sinuendo, a collaboration between Ry Cooder and Manuel Galban, which won the Grammy Award for Best Pop Instrumental Album later in the year. Mexican singer-songwriter Marco Antonio Solís became the first performer to peak at number one 4 times in the same calendar year: twice as the lead member of Los Bukis and twice as a solo artist with La Historia Continúa... and Tu Amor o Tu Desprecio. Ranchero performer Pepe Aguilar debuted at number two on the chart on April 12, 2003 with Y Tenerte Otra Vez and the following week climbed to number one.

Un Día Normal, by Colombian performer Juanes, reached the top spot of the chart on its 68th week, 17 days after it won the Latin Grammy Award for Album of the Year. Mexican singer Luis Miguel released his 16th studio album, 33, which became his fifth number-one set, while fellow Mexican norteño music band Los Tigres del Norte peaked at the top of this chart for the fourth time (out of 13 releases) with Herencia Musical: 20 Corridos Inolvidables. Ricky Martin's Almas del Silencio debuted within the Top 40 in twelve countries, received a Latin Grammy nomination and also debuted at number one on the 'Billboard Top Latin Albums chart.

Puerto Rican performer Ednita Nazario peaked at number one for the first time with her 20th album, Por Ti. Bronco's Siempre Arriba also spent one week at the top, replacing fellow Mexican performers Los Tigres del Norte on August 9, 2003. A.B. Quintanilla with Kumbia Kings, Intocable and Los Temerarios were the only performers to hit the top spot twice in 2003. Cuban salsa performer Celia Cruz, who died on July 16, 2003, debuted at number one on the chart and won the Grammy Award for Best Salsa/Merengue Album with her last recording Regalo del Alma.

Albums

References

2003 Latin
United States Latin Albums
2003 in Latin music